Conopomorpha is a genus of moths in the family Gracillariidae.

Species
Conopomorpha antimacha Meyrick, 1907
Conopomorpha chionochtha Meyrick, 1907
Conopomorpha chionosema Vári, 1961
Conopomorpha cramerella (Snellen, 1904)
Conopomorpha cyanospila Meyrick, 1886
Conopomorpha euphanes Vári, 1961
Conopomorpha flueggella Li, 2011
Conopomorpha fustigera (Meyrick, 1928)
Conopomorpha habrodes Meyrick, 1907
Conopomorpha heliopla Meyrick, 1907
Conopomorpha litchiella Bradley, 1986
Conopomorpha oceanica Bradley, 1986
Conopomorpha sinensis Bradley, 1986
Conopomorpha zaplaca Meyrick, 1907

External links
Global Taxonomic Database of Gracillariidae (Lepidoptera)

 
Gracillariinae
Gracillarioidea genera